If I Were a Rich Man may refer to:
If I Were a Rich Man (song), a song from the musical Fiddler on the Roof
If I Were a Rich Man (film), a 2002 film
"If I Were a Rich Man", an episode from the series Married... with Children
"If I Were a Rich Man", an episode from the series Ground Floor